Lichenopeltella uncialicola is a species of fungus belonging to the class Dothideomycetes. The species was discovered in Iceland in 2010 where it was found growing on Cladonia uncialis. Since then, it has been found on a different host species, Cladonia rangiferina, in North-Korea, Italy Austria, and Greenland.

References

Dothideomycetes
Fungi described in 2010
Fungi of Iceland
Fungi of Europe